Pieter Mey (born 17 December 1948) is a South African politician and former police lieutenant. He has been serving as a Member of the National Assembly of South Africa for the Freedom Front Plus (FF Plus) since May 2019. Mey is also the Eastern Cape provincial leader of the FF Plus.

Early life and education
Mey was born in 1948 in the town of Willowmore in the Union of South Africa. He matriculated from Willowmore High School in 1966. He obtained a B.Iuris degree in law from the University of Port Elizabeth.

Career
Mey joined the South African Police in 1966. He served in Pretoria, Johannesburg, Lusikisiki, Port Elizabeth and Western Area. He resigned from the police force in 1980 with the rank of lieutenant and started working in the real estate industry.

Politics
Mey was later appointed leader of the Freedom Front Plus in the Eastern Cape. In 2014 he stood for election to the South African National Assembly. He was not elected.

In 2019 Mey stood for the National Assembly again. This time he was successful in his bid. He serves on the Portfolio Committee on Transport and the Portfolio Committee on Environment, Forestry and Fisheries.

Personal life
Mey is married to Elizabeth Anne, and has three children.

References

External links

Living people
Members of the National Assembly of South Africa
Freedom Front Plus politicians
People from the Eastern Cape
Afrikaner people
1948 births